The Aegidae are a family of isopod crustaceans. The adults are temporary parasites of fish, feeding on their hosts' blood before dropping off to digest the meal. They differ from members of the family Cirolanidae in having only three pairs of hook-like pereiopods, whereas in Cirolanidae all seven pairs of pereiopods are hooked. The family was first described by Adam White in 1850. 

The family contains the following genera:
Aega Leach, 1815
Aegapheles Bruce, 2009
Aegiochus Bovallius, 1885
Alitropus H. Milne-Edwards, 1840
Epulaega Bruce, 2009
Rocinela Leach, 1818
Syscenus Harger, 1880
Xenuraega Tattersall, 1909

References

Cymothoida
Crustacean families
Crustaceans described in 1850
Taxa named by Adam White (zoologist)